The basketwork eel, Diastobranchus  capensis, is a cutthroat eel, the only species in the genus Diastobranchus. It is found off southern Australia, South Africa, and around New Zealand, in depths over 1,000 m. Its length is between 80 and 120 cm.

References

 
 
 Tony Ayling & Geoffrey Cox, Collins Guide to the Sea Fishes of New Zealand,  (William Collins Publishers Ltd, Auckland, New Zealand 1982) 

Synaphobranchidae

Fish described in 1923